Dejan Židan (born 16 October 1967 in Maribor) is a Slovenian politician, former leader of the Social Democrats, and the former speaker of the National Assembly of Slovenia.

A veterinarian by education, Židan served as minister of agriculture, forestry, and nutrition from 2010 in 2012 in Borut Pahor's government. In the 2011 parliamentary election, Židan was elected a member of the National Assembly. In 2013, Židan became minister of agriculture and the environment in Alenka Bratušek's government. In March 2014, Židan was named the most popular Slovenian politician in a public opinion poll. Following the European Parliament election, Židan replaced Igor Lukšič as acting president of the Social Democrats.

References 

1967 births
Presidents of the National Assembly (Slovenia) 
Living people
Deputy Prime Ministers of Slovenia
Social Democrats (Slovenia) politicians
Politicians from Maribor
Agriculture ministers of Slovenia
Environment ministers of Slovenia
Food ministers of Slovenia
Forestry ministers of Slovenia